Marie Juliette Louvet (9 May 1867 – 24 September 1930) was the lover of the unmarried Prince Louis II of Monaco and the mother of his only child, Princess Charlotte of Monaco.

Known as Juliette, Louvet was the daughter of Jacques Henri Louvet (18301910) and his first wife, Joséphine Elmire Piedefer (18281871).

She married the photographer Achille Delmaet, but they divorced in 1893. They had two children, Georges and Marguerite. Juliette Delmaet became an entertainer of sorts, reportedly a cabaret singer. In 1897, she was a hostess in a Montmartre nightclub when she met Prince Louis of Monaco. She gave birth to their daughter, Charlotte, in Constantine, French Algeria, in 1898, where Louis served in the French Army with a regiment of Chasseurs d'Afrique (African Light Horse), and where she justified her presence at the military barracks as a laundress. Through her daughter she is the maternal grandmother of Rainier III, Prince of Monaco and Princess Antoinette, Baroness of Massy.

Notes

1867 births
1930 deaths
People from Seine-Maritime
House of Grimaldi
Royal mistresses
Cabaret singers